ESOP may refer to:

 European Symposium on Programming, a conference in computer science
 Employee stock ownership plan, an employee-owner scheme
 The Epigraphic Society Occasional Publications and Papers, a journal ( and )

See also
Aesop, an ancient Greek storyteller